Rodds Bay is a coastal locality in the Gladstone Region, Queensland, Australia.

Geography
The waters and inlets of the Coral Sea form the north-western, northern, and north-eastern boundaries.

References 

Gladstone Region
Coastline of Queensland
Localities in Queensland